The Icelandic Ministry of Finance is responsible for overseeing the finances of the Icelandic government. The Minister for Finance and Economic Affairs is Bjarni Benediktsson.

Organization of the Ministry of Finance
The top civil servant in the Ministry of Finance is Baldur Gudlaugsson, who was appointed Permanent Secretary from November 1, 2000. From February 6 to April 30, 2009, Indridi H. Thorlaksson is acting Permanent Secretary while Mr. Gudlaugsson is on leave. He runs the ministry on a day-to-day basis and is the chief liaison between the Minister and the civil servants. There are six departments of the Ministry of Finance, each of which is headed by a Director-General. The Ministry staff numbers around 80 specialists and support personnel.

Administration Department
The Administration Department is responsible for general operations of the Ministry, preparation of the ministry's annual operational budget and supervision of the Ministry's information services. It is headed by Angantyr Einarsson since September 1, 2007.

Budget Department
The Budget Department's main job is to oversee the production of the government's fiscal budget. In addition the Budget Department provides support for the supplementary budget and the government accounts bill. The Budget Office oversees relations with other Ministries and the Parliament concerning the preparation of the Treasury's budget. Nokkvi Bragason is in charge of this department since March 1, 2008.

Economic Department
The Economic Department is in charge of economic studies in Iceland. This involves surveying the economic situation and its prospects, and forecasting economic trends based on macroeconomic models. The Economic Department is also responsible for providing the revenue forecast for the fiscal budget and performing research into tax and benefit systems. The department oversees the Treasury’s domestic and international cooperation concerning economic matters. Thorsteinn Thorgeirsson is Director-General for this department since January 1, 2005.

Financial Management Department
The Financial Management Department manages the government's assets and the Treasury fund. This department also ensures the proposed budget is carried out as per legal requirements and that the executive branch is run efficiently. The Director-General of this department is Thorhallur Arason.

Personnel Policy Department
The main role of the Personnel Policy Department is to represent the Ministry in labor market matters and to present its views. The department also offers advice on the implementation and interpretation of laws, regulations, agreements and government decisions. The Wage Negotiations Committee of the government operates in close cooperation with the department. Gunnar Bjornsson is in charge of this department.

Taxation and Legal Affairs Department
The main task of the department is to deal with tax matters, to draft bills for the Althingi and interpret existing laws. It also conducts research into the impact of existing taxes and tax changes. The Director-General of this department is Marianna Jonasdottir.

National Tax Investigation Police

Goals of the Ministry
The Ministry's main goals are:
Economic stability and a high standard of living
A balanced treasury over the longer term
An economical and efficient tax environment
Responsible and performance oriented management of state finances
Transparent government operations and an effective organizational structure
State of staff of the highest quality
Delivery of a reliable service with the emphasis on professional work

Former Ministers of Finance

Kingdom of Iceland (1918–1942)
Björn Kristjánsson (1917)
Sigurður Eggerz (1917–1920)
Magnús Guðmundsson (1920–1922)
Magnús Jónsson (1922–1923)
Klemens Jónsson (Heimastjórnarflokkurinn) (1923–1924)
Jón Þorláksson (Íhaldsflokkurinn) (1924–1927)
Magnús Kristjánsson (Progressive Party) (1927–1928)
Tryggvi Þórhallsson (Progressive Party) (1928–1929)
Einar Árnason (Progressive Party) (1928–1931)
Tryggvi Þórhallsson (Progressive Party) (1931)
Ásgeir Ásgeirsson (Progressive Party) (1931–1934)
Eysteinn Jónsson (Progressive Party) (1934–1939)
Jakob Möller (Independence Party) (1939–1942)
Source:

Republic of Iceland (1942 – present)
Björn Ólafsson (independent) (1942–1944)
Pétur Magnússon (Independence) (1944–1947)
Jóhann Þ. Jósefsson (Independence) (1947–1949)
Björn Ólafsson (Independence) (1949–1950)
Eysteinn Jónsson (Progressive) (1950–1954)
Skúli Guðmundsson (Progressive)  (1950–1954)
Eysteinn Jónsson (Progressive) (1954–1958)
Guðmundur Í. Guðmundsson (Social Democratic) (1958–1959)
Gunnar Thoroddsen (Independence) (1959–1965)
Magnús Jónsson (Independence) (1965–1971)
Halldór E. Sigurðsson (Progressive) (1971–1974)
Matthías Árni Mathiesen (Independence) (1974–1978)
Tómas Árnason (Progressive) (1978–1979)
Sighvatur Björgvinsson (Social Democratic) (1979–1980)
Ragnar Arnalds (People's Alliance) (1980–1983)
Albert Guðmundsson (Independence) (1983–1985)
Þorsteinn Pálsson (Independence) (1985–1987)
Jón Baldvin Hannibalsson (Social Democratic) (1987–1988)
Ólafur Ragnar Grímsson (Social Democratic Alliance) (1989–1991)
Friðrik Sophusson (Independence) (1991–1998)
Geir H. Haarde (Independence) (1998–2005)
Árni M. Mathiesen (Independence) (2005–2009)
Steingrímur J. Sigfússon (Left Green) (2009–2011)
Oddný G. Harðardóttir (Social Democratic Alliance) (2011-2012)
Katrín Júlíusdóttir (Social Democratic Alliance) (2012-2013)
Bjarni Benediktsson (Independence) (2013-2017)
Benedikt Jóhannesson (Reform) (2017-2017)
Bjarni Benediktsson (Independence) (2017–present)
Source:

References

External links
Official site

Finance
Iceland